The École Nationale Supérieure des Mines de Rabat called also Mines Rabat in French or Rabat School of Mines  in English is a leading Grande école engineering school in Morocco. The previous school's name was École Nationale de l'Industrie Minérale .

Based in Rabat, Mines Rabat is one of the oldest engineering schools in Morocco. Mines Rabat is a member of the Conférence des grandes écoles (CGE). The course for the engineering program lasts three years and the admission is done mainly by the common national competition (CNC) after making two or three years of preparatory classes.

Despite its small size (fewer than 300 students are accepted each year, after a very selective exam), it is a crucial part of the infrastructure of the Moroccan industry.

In the limit of available places candidates can be admitted to the Engineering Cycle by level:

 Associate
 Bachelor
 University's Master 

The engineering cycle is 3 years for applicants holding an associate's or a bachelor's degree and is 2 years for applicants holding a, master's degree.

The Ph.D. and Deng cycles are 3 to 5 years for applicants holding an engineering degree or a master's degree.

Rabat School of Mines (Mines Rabat) can be compared in similarities to Mines ParisTech, Mines Saint-Étienne, and Mines Nancy schools in France, Columbia School of Mines, Colorado School of Mines in the USA, and Royal School of Mines in the UK

Admissions 
Admission to Mines Rabat in the normal cycle is made through a very selective entrance examination and requires at least two years of preparation after high school in preparatory classes. Admission includes a week of written examinations during the spring followed sometimes by oral examinations over the summer.

History 
The school was established in 1972 and now about 300 Moroccan students are admitted each year. Foreign students, having followed a class préparatoire curriculum (generally, African students) can also enter through the same competitive exam. Finally, some foreign students come for a single year from other top institutions in Africa.

Rankings 
Mines Rabat is ranked among the top 5 Moroccan Grandes Ecoles, though it doesn't appear in international rankings due to its very limited number of students (900 students per year for the class of 2022).

Options and majors 
The Mines Rabat has a total of 15 engineering options:

 Energy Engineering (GE)
 Operations Planning Protection of Soil and Basement (AEPSSS (Mines))
 Environment and Industrial Safety (ESI)
 Computer Engineering (GI)
 Production Systems (PS)
 Electromechanical (ELM)
 Industrial Maintenance (MI)
 Mechanical Engineering and Development (GDM)
 Industrial Engineering (GInd)
 Process Engineering (IP)
 Materials and Quality Control (MCQ)
 Hydro-Geotechnical Engineering (HG)
 Renewable energy (RE)

Other schools of Mines in France
 École nationale supérieure des Mines d'Albi Carmaux (Mines Albi-Carmaux)
 École nationale supérieure des Mines d'Alès (Mines Alès)
 École nationale supérieure des Mines de Douai (Mines Douai)
 École nationale supérieure des Mines de Nancy
 École nationale supérieure des Mines de Nantes (Mines Nantes)
 École nationale supérieure des Mines de Paris (Mines ParisTech)
 École nationale supérieure des mines de Saint-Étienne (Mines Saint-Étienne)

Other schools of Mines in the USA
 Colorado School of Mines
 Columbia School of Mines

Other schools of Mines in the UK
 Royal School of Mines

Other schools of Mines in China
 China University of Mining and Technology

Other schools of Mines in Sweden
 Swedish School of Mines

International 
Agreements signed with:
 France:
 Central Group of Schools (École Centrale Paris, École Centrale de Lyon, École Centrale de Marseille, École Centrale de Casablanca ...)
 Groupe des écoles des mines (GEM) (Mines ParisTech, Mines Saint-Étienne (ENSM SE), Mines Nancy, École des mines d'Alès, ...)
 National Polytechnic Institute of Lorraine (INPL)
 École Nationale Supérieure de Mécanique et des Microtechniques (ENSMM)
 Aix Marseille University
 University of Technology of Compiègne (UTC)
 INSA Lyon
 Belgium:
 Faculté polytechnique de Mons
 Université catholique de Louvain (UCL)
 Switzerland:
École Polytechnique Fédérale de Lausanne (EPFL)
 Canada:
 Ecole Polytechnique de Montreal
 Laval University
 United States:
Georgia Institute of Technology
 Tunisia:
 National Engineering School of Tunis (ENIT)

External links 
 
 CGE
 "Grandes Ecoles" organisation scheme vs.  the classic university scheme

Education in Morocco